Daniel Breen may refer to:
Dan Breen (1894–1969), Irish politician
J. Daniel Breen (born 1950), American federal judge